The Reichsgau Sudetenland was an administrative division of Nazi Germany from 1939 to 1945. It comprised the northern part of the Sudetenland territory, which was annexed from Czechoslovakia according to the 30 September 1938 Munich Agreement. The Reichsgau was headed by the former Sudeten German Party leader, now Nazi Party functionary Konrad Henlein as Gauleiter and Reichsstatthalter. From October 1938 to May 1939, it was the regional subdivision of the Nazi Party in that area, also under Henlein's leadership. The administrative capital was Reichenberg (Liberec).

History

In the course of the German occupation of Czechoslovakia, on 30 September 1938 the Heads of Government of the United Kingdom, France, Italy, and Germany signed the Munich Agreement, which enforced the cession of the Sudetenland to Germany. Czechoslovak representatives were not invited. On 1 October, invading Wehrmacht forces occupied the territory. The new Czechoslovak-German borders were officially fixed in a treaty on 21 November 1938. In consequence, the Czechoslovak Republic lost about one third of its population, its most important industrial area, and also its extended border fortifications.

Initially, the German Army (Heer) established a civil administration under occupational law. On 30 October 1938, Konrad Henlein was appointed Gauleiter and Reichskommissar of Sudetenland. The Sudeten German Party was merged into the Nazi Party, all other political parties were banned. The Czech population had to accept German citizenship or were expelled and forcibly relocated to the Czechoslovak rump state, which itself from 15 March 1939 was occupied by Germany and incorporated as the "Protectorate of Bohemia and Moravia".

After the proclamation of the Protectorate of Bohemia and Moravia, the Reichsgau was formally established by law on 25 March 1939, in effect from 15 April, borders were adjusted and the administrative structure was fixed on May 1. Konrad Henlein was named Reichsstatthalter. The administrative capital was Reichenberg (Liberec). Smaller areas in the east, such as the Hlučín Region, were ceded to the Prussian Province of Silesia, while the western and southern Sudetenland territories were attached to the Bavarian Gau Bayreuth as well as to the Austrian Reichsgaue Oberdonau and Niederdonau.

After Germany's defeat in World War II, the Czechoslovak state was re-established and the Sudeten German population was expelled.

The Theresienstadt concentration camp was located in the Protectorate of Bohemia and Moravia, near the border to the Reichsgau Sudetenland. It was designed to concentrate the Jewish population from the Protectorate and gradually move them to extermination camps and also held Western European and German Jews. While not an extermination camp itself the harsh and unhygienic conditions still resulted in the death of 33,000 of the 140,000 Jews brought to the camp while a further 88,000 were sent to extermination camps and only 19,000 survived.

Gauleiter
 Konrad Henlein: 30 October 1938 to 8 May 1945

Administration 

The Reichsgau Sudetenland was divided into three Regierungsbezirke. These were subdivided into 58 districts (Kreise), largely corresponding to the former Czechoslovak okresy:

Regierungsbezirk Aussig 
President: 
1939–1945: Hans Krebs

Urban districts 
 Aussig
 Reichenberg

Rural districts 
 Aussig
 Bilin
 Böhmisch Leipa
 Braunau
 Brüx
 Dauba
 Deutsch Gabel
 Dux
 Friedland (Isergebirge)
 Gablonz an der Neiße
 Hohenelbe
 Komotau
 Leitmeritz
 Reichenberg
 Rumburg
 Schluckenau
 Teplitz-Schönau
 Tetschen-Bodenbach
 Trautenau
 Warnsdorf

Regierungsbezirk Eger 
President:
1939–1940: Wilhelm Sebekovsky
1940–1945: Karl Müller

Urban districts 

 Eger
 Karlsbad

Rural districts 
 Asch
 Bischofteinitz
 Eger
 Elbogen
 Falkenau an der Eger
 Graslitz
 Kaaden
 Karlsbad
 Luditz
 Marienbad
 Mies
 Neudek
 Podersam
 Preßnitz
 Saaz 
 Sankt Joachimsthal 
 Tachau
 Tepl

Regierungsbezirk Troppau 
President:
1939–1943: Friedrich Zippelius
1943–1945: Karl Ferdinand Edler von der Planitz

Urban districts 
 Troppau

Rural districts 
 Bärn
 Freiwaldau
 Freudenthal
 Grulich
 Hohenstadt
 Jägerndorf
 Landskron
 Mährisch Schönberg
 Mährisch Trübau
 Neu Titschein
 Römerstadt
 Sternberg
 Troppau
 Wagstadt
 Zwittau

See also
 Gauliga Sudetenland, the highest association football league in the Gau from 1938 to 1945
The Holocaust in the Sudetenland

References

Further reading

External links
 Illustrated list of Gauleiter

Sudetenland
1939 establishments in Germany
1945 disestablishments in Germany
Sudetenland
Holocaust locations in Czechoslovakia